Tokio Marine Kiln is a global specialist insurance company with offices in London, Shanghai, Singapore and Rio de Janeiro. It was formed in 2014 after a merger between R.J Kiln and Tokio Marine Europe.

Operations / Services

History
Tokio Marine Kiln was formed in 2014 by the merger of R.J. Kiln and Tokio Marine Europe.  R.J Kiln had been purchased by the Tokio Marine Group in 2007 for £442m and was subsequently delisted from the London Stock Exchange. After seven years running as an independent subsidiary of the Tokio Marine Group, it was merged with Tokio Marine Europe. R.J Kiln was founded by Robert Kiln in 1963 as a specialist Lloyd's of London insurance syndicate.

Tokio Marine Europe was founded in 1888 as the European arm of the Tokio Marine Group.

References

Tokio Marine
Insurance companies of the United Kingdom
Financial services companies based in the City of London
Financial services companies established in 1888